The 20th Filmfare Awards were held in 1973, awarding the films made in 1972.

Amar Prem and Be-Imaan led the ceremony with 8 nominations, followed by Shor with 7 nominations and Pakeezah with 5 nominations.

Be-Imaan won 7 awards, including Best Film, Best Director (for Sohanlal Kanwar), Best Actor (for Manoj Kumar) and Best Supporting Actor (for Pran), thus becoming the most-awarded film at the ceremony.

Pran, who won Best Supporting Actor for Be-Imaan refused to accept the award, on the grounds that the Best Music Director award should have gone to Ghulam Mohammed for Pakeezah, and not Shankar-Jaikishan for Be-Imaan.

Rajesh Khanna received dual nominations for Best Actor for his performances in Amar Prem and Dushmun, but lost to Manoj Kumar who won the award for Be-Imaan.

Main Awards

Best Film
 Be-Imaan 
Anubhav
Pakeezah

Best Director
 Sohanlal Kanwar – Be-Imaan 
Kamal Amrohi – Pakeezah
Manoj Kumar – Shor

Best Actor
 Manoj Kumar – Be-Imaan 
Rajesh Khanna – Amar Prem
Rajesh Khanna – Dushmun

Best Actress
 Hema Malini – Seeta Aur Geeta 
Meena Kumari – Pakeezah
Raakhee – Aankhon Aankhon Mein
Sharmila Tagore – Amar Prem

Best Supporting Actor
 Pran – Be-Imaan 
Premnath – Shor

Best Supporting Actress
 Zeenat Aman – Hare Rama Hare Krishna 
Bindu – Dastaan
Nazima – Be-Imaan

Best Comic Actor
 Paintal – Bawarchi 
Jagdeep – Bhai Ho To Aisa
Mehmood – Bombay To Goa

Best Story
 Anubhav – Basu Chatterjee 
Shor – Manoj Kumar

Best Screenplay
 Amar Prem –  Arabinda Mukhopadhyay

Best Dialogue
 Amar Prem –  Ramesh Pant

Best Music Director 
 Be-Imaan – Shankar-Jaikishan 
Amar Prem – R. D. Burman
Pakeezah – Ghulam Mohammed
Shor – Laxmikant–Pyarelal

Best Lyricist
 Be-Imaan – Verma Malik for Jai Bolo Be-Imaan Ki 
Amar Prem – Anand Bakshi for Chingari Koi Bhadke
Shor – Santosh Anand for Ek Pyaar Ka Nagma Hai

Best Playback Singer, Male
 Be-Imaan – Mukesh for Jai Bolo Be-Imaan Ki 
Amar Prem – Kishore Kumar for Chingari Koi Bhadke
Shor – Mukesh for Ek Pyaar Ka Nagma Hai

Best Playback Singer, Female
 Hare Rama Hare Krishna – Asha Bhosle for Dum Maro Dum 
Lal Patthar – Asha Bhosle for Suni Suni
Lalkaar – Asha Bhosle for Maine Kahan Na Na Na

Best Art Direction
 Pakeezah

Best Cinematography
 Seeta Aur Geeta

Best Editing
 Shor

Best Sound
 Amar Prem

Critics' Awards

Best Film
 Maya Darpan

Best Documentary
 Nine Months to Freedom

Controversy
 Filmfare editor B. K. Karanjia said both Ghulam Mohammad (the music director of Pakeezah) and Josef Wirsching (cinematographer) lost for the same reason.

Biggest Winners
 Be-Imaan – 7/8
 Amar Prem – 3/8
 Seeta Aur Geeta – 2/2
 Hare Rama Hare Krishna – 2/2
Shor – 1/7
Pakeezah – 1/5

See also
 22nd Filmfare Awards
 21st Filmfare Awards
 Filmfare Awards

References

 https://www.imdb.com/event/ev0000245/1973/

Filmfare Awards
Filmfare
1973 in Indian cinema